Hunnur  is a village in the southern state of Karnataka, India. It is located in the Jamkhandi taluk of Bagalkot district in Karnataka.

Demographics
 India census, Hunnur had a population of 8867 with 4470 males and 4397 females.

See also
 Bagalkot
 Districts of Karnataka

References

External links
 Bagalkote District | ಒಂದು ಜಿಲ್ಲೆ ಹಲವು ವೈಶಿಷ್ಟ್ಯಗಳು | India

Villages in Bagalkot district